Sana Dua is an Indian lawyer, motivational speaker, model and beauty pageant titleholder, who was declared as the Brand Ambassador of Election Commission Jammu & Kashmir for Lok Sabha Election 2019 by ECI.

She was crowned first runner up at Femina Miss India 2017 (Winner- Manushi Chhillar, second Runner up- Priyanka Kumari), and became the First Miss India from J&K.

She represented India at Miss United Continents 2017 contest in Guayaquil, Ecuador in September 2017 and made it to the top 10.

Early life and background
Sana was born in Assam, India in a Sikh family whose roots are in Jammu and Kashmir. Her father was in Indian Army. Sana studied for five years at the Army Public School Noida. Sana's elder brother Varun Dua, is a software engineer. She finished her graduation in law at Punjab University in Chandigarh. She practised law before entering the glamour world in 2015. Sana worked in Jammu and Kashmir High Court for a year while being attached with an advocate. Sana Dua won Femina Style Miss Diva North, 2016 award. She has worked extensively on the Save Water Campaign in Jammu.

After Miss India Competition 
Sana recently inaugurated the opening of a showroom of a leading global furniture company from Bangladesh called Hatil in Jammu, India.

She inaugurated her own startup, Image And Beyond By Sana Dua in 2019 which intends to help young girls find their true potential towards modeling and pageantry.

References

External links

Miss United Continents India 2017

Living people
1993 births